The 2014–15 Sydney Blue Sox season was the team's fifth season. The Blue Sox competed in the Australian Baseball League (ABL) against five other teams, playing its home games at Blacktown International Sportspark Sydney.

Regular season

Standings

Record vs opponents

Game log 

|-bgcolor=#bbffbb
| 1
| 31 October
| @  
| 9-4
| C. Anderson
| S. Sanford
| -
| 1-0
| 
|-

|-bgcolor=#bbffbb
| 2
| 1 November (DH 1)
| @ 
| 7-3
| M. Solbach
| C. Lamb
| -
| 2-0
| 
|-bgcolor=#ffbbbb 
| 3
| 1 November (DH 2)
| @ 
| 0-5
| S. Mitchinson
| L. Wilkins
| -
| 2-1
| 
|-bgcolor=#ffbbbb
| 4
| 2 November
| @ 
| 9-20
| A. Burkard
| A. Sookee
| -
| 2-2
| 
|-bgcolor=#bbffbb
| 5
| 6 November
| @ 
| 9-0
| M. Solbach
| B. Grening
| -
| 3-2
| 
|-bgcolor=#ffbbbb 
| 6
| 7 November
| @ 
| 2-4
| T. Atherton
| C. Anderson
| D. Crenshaw
| 3-3
|  
|-bgcolor=#bbffbb
| 7
| 8 November
| @ 
| 3-1
| L. Wilkins
| T. Crawford
| D. Koo
| 4-3
| 
|-bgcolor=#bbffbb
| 8
| 9 November
| @ 
| 7-5
| T. Cox
| G. Hernandez
| M. Solbach
| 5-3
| 
|-bgcolor=#bbffbb
| 9
| 13 November
| 
| 2-0
| C. Anderson
| B. Grening
| -
| 6-3
| 
|-bgcolor=#bbffbb
| 10
| 14 November
|  
| 7-6
| W. Lundgren
| D. Crenshaw
| -
| 7-3
| 
|-bgcolor=#ffbbbb
| 11
| 15 November
|  
| 1-8
| T. Atherton
| L. Wilkins
| J. Brown
| 7-4
| 
|-bgcolor=#ffbbbb 
| 12
| 16 November
| 
| 6-11
| W. Ough
| V. Harris
| -
| 7-5
| 
|-bgcolor=#bbffbb
| 13
| 20 November
| @ 
| 5-3
| M. Solbach
| N. Blount
| D. Koo
| 8-5
| 
|-bgcolor=#ffbbbb 
| 14
| 21 November
| @ 
| 2-4
| C. Buckel
| C. Anderson
| K. Miyata
| 8-6
| 
|-bgcolor=#bbffbb
| 15
| 22 November
| @ 
| 12-8
| A. Sookee
| J. Kennedy
| -
| 9-6
| 
|-bgcolor=#ffbbbb 
| 16
| 23 November
| @ 
| 4-10
| K. Miyata
| V Harris
| -
| 9-7
| 
|-bgcolor=#bbffbb
| 17
| 27 November
| 
| 9-5
| M. Solbach
| B. Baker
| -
| 10-7
| 
|-bgcolor=#ffbbbb 
| 18
| 28 November
| 
| 2-6
| D. Schmidt
| C. Anderson
| J. Marban
| 10-8
| 
|-bgcolor=#bbffbb
| 19
| 29 November
| 
| 7-1
| L. Wilkins
| S. Sanford
| -
| 11-8
| 
|-bgcolor=#ffbbbb 
| 20
| 30 November
| 
| 0-2
| B. Shorto
| L. Wells
| M. Acker
| 11-9
| 
|-

|-bgcolor=#bbbbbb
| 21
| 11 December
| 
| PPD - RAIN
| -
| -
| -
| -
| 
|-bgcolor=#ffbbbb 
| 22
| 12 December
| 
| 4-5
| J. Tols
| A. Sookee
| T. Brunnemann
| 11-10
| 
|-bgcolor=#ffbbbb 
| 23
| 13 December (DH 1)
| 
| 0-3
| W. Lee
| C. Anderson
| W. Mathis
| 11-11
| 
|-bgcolor=#ffbbbb 
| 24
| 13 December (DH 2)
| 
| 0-6
| M. Coombs
| L. Wilkins
| -
| 11-12
| 
|-bgcolor=#bbffbb
| 25
| 14 December
| 
| 6-5
| J. Guyer
| J. Tols
| -
| 12-12
| 
|-bgcolor=#ffbbbb 
| 26
| 18 December
| @ 
| 3-10
| W. Mathis
| V. Harris
| -
| 12-13
| 
|-bgcolor=#ffbbbb 
| 27
| 19 December
| @ 
| 2-6
| J. Tols
| M. Solbach
| -
| 12-14
| 
|-bgcolor=#ffbbbb 
| 28
| 20 December
| @ 
| 2-4
| M. Coombs
| C. Anderson
| T. Brunnemann
| 12-15
| 
|-bgcolor=#ffbbbb 
| 29
| 21 December
| @ 
| 3-4
| J. Tols
| S. Landell
| -
| 12-16
| 
|-bgcolor=#ffbbbb 
| 30
| 26 December
| 
| 2-6
| M. Takashio
| M. Solbach
| -
| 12-17
| 
|-bgcolor=#bbffbb
| 31
| 27 December
| 
| 2-1
| C. Anderson
| C. Lin
| D. Koo
| 13-17
| 
|-bgcolor=#bbffbb
| 32
| 28 December
| 
| 6-4
| L. Wilkins
| R. Searle
| T. Van Steensel
| 14-17
| 
|-bgcolor=#bbffbb
| 33
| 29 December
| 
| 10-9
| W. Lundgren
| D. Cooper
| -
| 15-17
| 
|-

|-bgcolor=#bbffbb
| 34
| 2 January
| @ 
| 7-6
| A. Sookee
| T. Brunnemann
| T. Van Steensel
| 16-17
| 
|-bgcolor=#ffbbbb
| 35
| 3 January (DH 1)
| @  
| 7-11
| C. Stem
| C. Anderson
| -
| 16-18
| 
|-bgcolor=#ffbbbb 
| 36
| 3 January (DH 2)
| @ 
| 7-9
| T. Brunnemann
| D. Koo
| -
| 16-19
| 
|-bgcolor=#ffbbbb
| 37
| 4 January
| @ 
| 5-13
| D. Fidge
| S. Landell
| -
| 16-20
|  
|-bgcolor=#bbffbb
| 38
| 8 January
| 
| 16-4
| M. Solbach
| M. Wilson
| -
| 17-20
| 
|-bgcolor=#bbffbb
| 39
| 9 January
| 
| 7-0
| C. Anderson
| T. Brown
| -
| 18-20
| 
|-bgcolor=#bbbbbb 
| 40
| 10 January (DH 1)
| 
| PPD - RAIN
| -
| -
| -
| -
| 
|-bgcolor=#bbbbbb 
| 41
| 10 January (DH 2)
| 
| PPD - RAIN
| -
| -
| -
| -
| 
|-bgcolor=#ffbbbb 
| 42
| 15 January
| @ 
| 5-8
| R. Searle
| M. Solbach
| M. Timms
| 18-21
| 
|-bgcolor=#bbffbb
| 43
| 16 January
| @ 
| 4-3
| C. Anderson
| C. Lin
| A. Sookee
| 19-21
| 
|-bgcolor=#bbffbb
| 44
| 17 January
| @ 
| 7-2
| L. Wilkins
| D. Naylor
| -
| 20-21
| 
|-bgcolor=#ffbbbb 
| 45
| 18 January
| @ 
| 5-9
| M. Takashio
| J. Shergill
| -
| 20-22
| 
|-bgcolor=#ffbbbb 
| 46
| 22 January
| 
| 2-3
| B. Grening
| A. Sookee
| D. Crenshaw
| 20-23
| 
|-bgcolor=#bbffbb
| 47
| 23 January
| 
| 8-6
| L. Wilkins
| T. Atherton
| D. Koo
| 21-23
| 
|-bgcolor=#bbffbb
| 48
| 24 January
| 
| 2-1
| M. Solbach
| G. Hernandez
| A. Sookee
| 22-23
| 
|-bgcolor=#ffbbbb 
| 49
| 25 January
| 
| 2-7
| T. Crawford
| J. Shergill
| -
| 22-24
| 
|-

Postseason 

Three teams in the ABL qualified for a two-round postseason. The highest placed team at the end of the 2014-15 regular season, the Adelaide Bite gained entry to and hosted the Championship Series. The second and third place teams at the end of the 2014-15 regular season, the Perth Heat and the Sydney Blue Sox, respectively, played a Preliminary Final Series to determine the Adelaide Bite's opponent in the Championship Series. The Blue Sox fell to the Heat 0-2 in the Preliminary Final Series, thus ending the Blue Sox's postseason run and advancing the Heat to the Championship Series.

|-bgcolor=#ffbbbb 
| 1
| 30 January
| 
| 4-5
| M. Acker
| A. Sookee
| J. Marban
| 0-1
| 
|-bgcolor=#ffbbbb 
| 2
| 31 January
| @ 
| 2-9
| S. Mitchinson
| L. Wilkins
| -
| 0-2
| 
|-

Roster

References 

Sydney Blue Sox
Sydney Blue Sox